Hopeful Machines is a solo electronic music project of Ego Likeness member Steven Archer. He states that he uses this project as a sandbox for playing with sound and ideas, that it's about exploring "very complex sounds, and how much of that I can put in a piece of music before it becomes too much." Many of his releases are available free for download in various forms.

Discography 
2003:
 "Process and Product" 
2005:
 "One Step Into Cygnus"
 "Doom"
2006:
 "I am Still in this Forrest"
 "The Hole Between Here and Home"
 "Isthmus"
 "Alwaystoday"
2007:
 "I am an Island (And She Is My Ocean)"
 "Amphetamedian"
 "Theskydrinksonlyfrommymouth"
 "::Skinless::"
2008:
 "RedKingBlackRook"
2011:
 "On the Mending of Pack"
2013:
 "MinusZero" (March)
 "The Spring of the Drowned Girl"
2015:
 "A Shadow the Size of Everything"
2017:
 "Eplis Remains Inside"
 "Accidents and Other Incidents"
 "A Collection of Questionable Dance Songs"
 "Oubliette"
 "Plus V0ID"
2018:
 "Seres Anteriormente Existentes"
 "Soundtracks for Invisible Films"

Reception 
Archer's motto for the project is "Electronica for Sociopaths", which has been echoed in several reviews.

References

American industrial musicians
American electronic musicians